Jeremy Nevill Bamber (born Jeremy Paul Marsham; 13 January 1961) is a British convicted mass murderer. He was convicted of the 1985 White House Farm murders in Tolleshunt D'Arcy, Essex, in which the victims included Bamber's adoptive parents, Nevill and June Bamber; his adoptive sister, Sheila Caffell; and his sister's six-year-old twin sons, Daniel and Nicholas Caffell. Returning a majority guilty verdict, the jury found that, after committing the murders to secure a large inheritance, Bamber had placed the rifle in the hands of his 28-year-old sister, who had been diagnosed with schizophrenia, to make the scene appear to be a murder–suicide. 

Bamber is serving life imprisonment with a whole life tariff, meaning that he has no possibility of parole. He has repeatedly applied unsuccessfully to have his conviction overturned or his whole life tariff removed; his extended family remains convinced of his guilt. The Criminal Cases Review Commission (CCRC) referred the case to the Court of Appeal in 2001, which upheld the conviction in 2002. The appeal was rejected and the CCRC rejected further applications from Bamber in 2004 and 2012, with the commission stating in 2012 that it had not identified any new evidence or legal argument capable of raising a real possibility that his conviction would be quashed. On 10 March 2021, a new application was lodged with the Criminal CCRC for a referral to the Court of Appeal. As of 2023, he has spent 38 years behind bars, making him one of the longest-serving prisoners in the U.K.

Early life

Adoption, education
Jeremy Bamber was born Jeremy Paul Marsham at St Mary Abbots Hospital, Kensington, London, to Juliet Dorothy Wheeler (born 1938 in Leicester), a vicar's daughter who had had an affair with British Army Sergeant Major Leslie Brian Marsham (born 1931 in Tendring, Essex), a controller at Buckingham Palace. Wheeler gave the baby up for adoption in 1961, the year of his birth, through the Church of England Children's Society. Nevill and June Bamber adopted Bamber when he was six months old. It was only after his conviction that his biological parents were told by reporters that Bamber was their son. They were by then married to each other and working at Buckingham Palace.

The Bambers were wealthy farmers who lived in a large Georgian house at White House Farm, near Tolleshunt D'Arcy in Essex. Nevill was a local magistrate and former RAF pilot. In 1957, four years before adopting Jeremy, the couple had adopted a baby girl, Sheila.

Bamber attended St Nicholas Primary, followed by Maldon Court, a private prep school. In September 1970 he was sent to Gresham's School, a boarding school in Holt, Norfolk. Bamber left Gresham's with no qualifications, much to Nevill's anger, but managed to pass seven O-levels at The Sixth Form College in Colchester, which he left in 1978. Brett Collins claims Bamber had sexual relationships with men and women, finding that his good looks and charm made him popular with both.

Work
After leaving school Nevill financed a trip for Bamber to Australia, where he took a scuba diving course, and to New Zealand. In New Zealand, according to Collins, Bamber was "ripped off" by a would-be heroin dealer in Auckland. Bamber reportedly boasted of smuggling heroin overseas and broke into a jewellery shop to steal two expensive watches, one of which he gave to a girlfriend in the UK. One of Bamber's cousins claimed that he ended up leaving New Zealand in a hurry after friends of his had been involved in an armed robbery.

Bamber returned to the UK and worked in restaurants and bars, including a period as a waiter in a Little Chef on the A12; but he later agreed to return home and work on his father's farm. Although Bamber reportedly resented the low wages, he was given a car and lived rent-free in a cottage his father owned at 9 Head Street, Goldhanger,  from his family's farmhouse at White House Farm. He also owned eight percent of his family's caravan site, Osea Road Camp Sites Ltd., in Maldon. A few weeks before the murders, Bamber broke into and robbed the caravan park; this was only revealed following the murders, when he admitted to the robbery after his girlfriend Julie Mugford came forward as a witness against him.

White House Farm murders

Bamber claims he alerted police to the shootings at around 3:30am on 7 August 1985. He contests to have told them Nevill had telephoned him to say that Bamber's sister, Sheila Caffell, had gone "berserk" with Nevill's rifle. When police entered the farmhouse at White House Farm, Caffell was found dead on the floor of her parents' bedroom with the rifle up against her throat. June was found in the same room. Caffell's six-year-old twin sons, Nicholas and Daniel, were found in their beds in another upstairs room, while Nevill was found in the kitchen downstairs. The family had been shot a total of twenty-five times, mostly at close range.

Sheila had spent time in a psychiatric hospital undergoing treatment for schizophrenia months before the murders. The police believed that she was responsible until Mugford told them Jeremy had implicated himself. The prosecution argued that there was no evidence that Bamber's father had telephoned him, stating that Nevill was too badly injured to have spoken to anyone; that there was no blood on the kitchen phone; and that he would have called the police, not Bamber. They also argued that the silencer was on the rifle when the shots were fired and that Caffell's reach was not long enough to hold the gun and silencer at her throat and press the trigger. In addition, Sheila was not strong enough, they said, to have overcome Nevill in what appeared to have been a violent struggle in the kitchen. They also argued that the fact she had shot herself twice in her apparent suicide attempt was evidence that she was not the killer.

Bamber's  defence team have unsuccessfully challenged the evidence over the years. They alleged that a police log suggested that Bamber's father had indeed called the police that night and that the silencer may not have been on the gun during the attacks. The evidence about the silencer was unreliable, they argued, because the silencer was found in a farmhouse cupboard by one of Bamber's cousins three days after the murders.

Life in prison
Jeremy Bamber is currently confined at HM Prison Wakefield. Whilst there, he has worked as a peer partner, which involves helping other prisoners to read and write, and won several awards for transcribing books in the prison's braille workshop. In 2001, The Times alleged that he had been treated with indulgence at HM Prison Long Lartin, Worcestershire, where prisoners were given the key to their cells. Among the allegations claimed that he studied for his GCSE in Sociology and Media Studies, had a daily badminton lesson, and drew pictures of supermodels in an art class, which he later sold through an outside agent.

A group of outside supporters has formed around Bamber, and he has reportedly developed several close relationships with women since his conviction. He defended himself on one occasion from a knife attack by another prisoner by using a broken bottle, and on another received twenty-eight stitches on his neck after being attacked while making a telephone call. In 1994, Bamber called a radio station from Long Lartin prison to declare his innocence.

Legal actions
Bamber launched two unsuccessful legal actions while in prison to recover a share of his family's estate. His grandmother had cut Bamber out of her will when he was arrested, and most of the inheritance went to June's sister. In 2004, Bamber went to the High Court again to claim a share of the profits from the Bambers' caravan site in Maldon. He had retained his shares after his conviction, but had sold them to pay the legal costs arising from his claim on his grandmother's estate. The court ruled that he was not entitled to any profit from the site because of his conviction.

In January 2012, Bamber and two other British prisoners, Peter Moore and Douglas Vinter, lost a case before the European Court of Human Rights, in which they argued that whole-life imprisonment amounts to degrading and inhuman treatment. In July 2012, they were granted the right to appeal that decision. In July 2013, the Court's Grand Chamber ruled in their favour, holding that there must be sentence review with the potential of possible release.

On 10 March 2021, a new application was lodged with the CCRC for a referral to the Court of Appeal. The submissions contained new evidence not previously considered by the Courts. Initially, eight issues, each containing multiple grounds of appeal, were lodged, with another two added before the end of the year. In October 2022 it was reported that Bamber's legal team had sent the CCRC ten new items of evidence, which they claimed cast doubt on the prosecution's contention that the burns on Neville Bamber's back were caused by a rifle.

See also
White House Farm (TV series)
Bain family murders

References

1961 births
Living people
20th-century English criminals
British mass murderers
British murderers of children
Criminals from Essex
English adoptees
English people convicted of murder
English prisoners sentenced to life imprisonment
People convicted of murder by England and Wales
People educated at Gresham's School
People from Maldon District
Prisoners sentenced to life imprisonment by England and Wales